Stan M. White is a North Carolina politician who served as a member of the North Carolina Senate. A Democrat, he was appointed to represent Senate District 1 following the resignation of Sen. Marc Basnight just before the opening of the 2011 session of the legislature. He went on to lose the 2012 election to retain his seat by 21 votes out of more than 87,000 cast. White announced plans to run for the seat again in 2014.

White, who owns Stan White Realty and Construction on the Outer Banks, is a former Dare County commissioner and board chairman, and a former North Carolina Board of Transportation member.

White attended Manteo High School and is a graduate of East Carolina University.

References

News & Observer: Panel elects Basnight successor

External links
Official site

 

County commissioners in North Carolina
Living people
Democratic Party North Carolina state senators
East Carolina University alumni
21st-century American politicians
Year of birth missing (living people)